Libor Žůrek (born 2 November 1979 in Kojetín, Czechoslovakia) is Czech retired footballer. He was a striker, with his biggest asset being his speed and great acceleration which makes him among the fastest players in the league.

Žůrek played for Czech youth national teams since the under-15 level, and in 2002 he was part of Czech under 21 side which won the UEFA U-21 Championships in Switzerland.

Honours
With Baník Ostrava:
Gambrinus liga: 2003/04
Czech Cup: 2004/05

With Czech U-21s:
UEFA European Under-21 Football Championship: 2002

References

External links
 
 
 
 1fctatran profile 

1979 births
Living people
People from Kojetín
Czech footballers
Czech expatriate footballers
Czech Republic youth international footballers
Czech Republic under-21 international footballers
Czech First League players
Czech National Football League players
FC Baník Ostrava players
FC Fastav Zlín players
1. FC Tatran Prešov players
Slovak Super Liga players
Expatriate footballers in Slovakia
Expatriate footballers in Austria
Czech expatriate sportspeople in Slovakia
Czech expatriate sportspeople in Austria
Association football forwards
SK Hanácká Slavia Kroměříž players
Sportspeople from the Olomouc Region